Beauharnais v. Illinois, 343 U.S. 250 (1952), was a case that came before the United States Supreme Court in 1952. It upheld an Illinois law making it illegal to publish or exhibit any writing or picture portraying the "depravity, criminality, unchastity, or lack of virtue of a class of citizens of any race, color, creed or religion". It is most known for giving a legal basis to some degree that forms of hate speech that may be deemed to breach US libel law are not protected by the First Amendment.

The petitioner in Beauharnais distributed a leaflet "setting forth a petition calling on the Mayor and City Council of Chicago 'to halt the further encroachment, harassment and invasion of white people, their property, neighborhoods and persons, by the Negro.'" His criminal conviction by the trial court was sustained by the Illinois Supreme Court, and upheld by the U.S. Supreme Court after it rejected a Fourteenth Amendment due process challenge.

In his opinion, Justice Frankfurter argued that the speech conducted by the defendant had breached libel and so was reasoned to be outside the protection of the First and Fourteenth Amendments.

In his dissenting opinion, Associate Justice Black quoted Pyrrhus of Epirus by alluding to the term Pyrrhic victory: "If minority groups hail this holding as their victory, they might consider the possible relevancy of this ancient remark: 'Another such victory and I am undone'".

Subsequent history
Although Beauharnais has not been overturned, subsequent Supreme Court decisions such as New York Times Co. v. Sullivan (1964), R.A.V. v. City of St. Paul (1992), and Brandenburg v. Ohio (1969) have adopted a more speech-protective position.

See also
 List of United States Supreme Court cases, volume 343
 List of United States Supreme Court cases
 List of United States Supreme Court cases by the Vinson Court
 List of United States Supreme Court cases involving the First Amendment

References

External links

1952 in United States case law
United States Supreme Court cases
United States Supreme Court cases of the Vinson Court
United States Free Speech Clause case law